Gaslit may refer to:
 Gaslit (TV series), a 2022 political thriller about the Watergate scandal
 "Gaslit" (Gossip Girl episode), a 2010 episode of the CW television series

See also
 Gaslight (disambiguation)